Acanthoderes daviesii is a species of beetle in the family Cerambycidae. It was described by Swederus in 1787.

References

Acanthoderes
Beetles described in 1787